Louis Clark (1947–2021) was a British musical arranger and keyboard player.

Louis Clark is also the name of:

 Louis Clark (wide receiver) (born 1964), former Seattle Seahawks player
 Louis Clark (American football coach), former Dayton Flyers and Dayton Triangles head coach
 Louis Clark (English footballer) (born 1990), English footballer

See also

 Lewis Clark (disambiguation)
 Lewis Whitehouse Clark (1828–1900), U.S. judge, Chief Justice for New Hampshire
 Lewis and Clark (disambiguation)
 
 Louis (disambiguation)
 Clark (disambiguation)
 Louis Clarke (disambiguation)